The Dominican Summer Tigers are a minor league baseball team in the Dominican Summer League. The team plays in the San Pedro de Macoris division and is affiliated with the Detroit Tigers.

Roster

References

External links
 MiLB.com team page
 Baseball Reference team page
DSL Tigers on SABR Minor Leagues Database

Dominican Summer League teams
Baseball teams in the Dominican Republic
Detroit Tigers minor league affiliates